Wang Tianpu (born 1962), is a Chinese chemical engineer and CEO. He was the former president of Sinopec, one of the three largest state-owned oil companies in China. On April 27, 2015, Wang was placed under investigation by the Central Commission for Discipline Inspection, the Chinese Communist Party's anti-corruption agency. He expelled from the Communist Party on September 18, 2015. Two years later, he was sentenced to 15 years and 6 months in prison for graft.

Biography
Wang was born in 1962 in Changle County, Shandong Province. In July 1985, Wang obtained BEng in organic chemical engineering from Qingdao Institute of Chemical Industry. Wang obtained MBA from Dalian University of Technology in July 1996. In August 2003, Wang obtained doctor of chemical engineering from Zhejiang University in Hangzhou. Wang is a (national) senior engineer equivalent to professor.

From August 2001 to April 2003, Wang was a vice-president of Sinopec. From April 2003 to March 2005, Wang was a senior/exclusive vice-president of Sinopec. Since March 2005, Wang has been the President of Sinopec. Since May 2006, Wang has been elected as a Director of the Board of Sinopec.

On April 27, 2015, Wang Tianpu was placed under investigation by the Communist Party's internal disciplinary body for "serious violations of laws and regulations". Wang was expelled from the Communist Party on September 18, 2015. On January 24, 2017, Wang was sentenced to 15 years and 6 months in prison.

References

External links
 Wang Tianpu's profile on Forbes.com
 China Vitae: Biography of Wang Tianpu

Engineers from Shandong
1962 births
Living people
People from Weifang
Zhejiang University alumni
Businesspeople from Shandong
Chemists from Shandong
Expelled members of the Chinese Communist Party
Chinese white-collar criminals